Shibden Hall is a Grade II* listed historic house located in a public park at Shibden, West Yorkshire, England. The building has been extensively modified from its original design by generations of residents, although its Tudor half-timbered frontage remains its most recognisable feature.

One of its most notable residents was Anne Lister who inherited the hall from a relative. Lister has been described as being the "first modern lesbian" due to her "love... [of] the fairer sex" that she documented in her diaries.

History
The hall dates back to around 1420, when it was recorded as being inhabited by one William Otes. Prior to 1619, the estate was owned by the Savile and Waterhouse families. The three families' armorial symbols are recorded in a stone-mullioned 20-light window at the hall.

For more than 300 years (c. 1615–1926) the Shibden estate was in the hands of the Lister family, wealthy mill-owners and cloth merchants, the most famous resident being Anne Lister (1791–1840), who became sole owner of the hall after the death of her aunt. She commissioned York architect John Harper and landscape gardener Samuel Gray in 1830 to make extensive improvements to the house and grounds. A gothic tower was added to the building for use as a library and the major features of the park created, including terraced gardens, rock gardens, cascades and a boating lake. A "Paisley shawl" garden designed for the terrace by Joshua Major was added in the 1850s. After Anne Lister's death in 1840 in the Caucasus, the estate passed to her partner, Ann Walker, who died in 1854. Possession then returned to the Lister family, who donated it to Halifax Corporation in 1933. In 1934 the Corporation opened it as a museum. The estate became a public park in 1926 and the hall a museum in 1934.

The property has been a Grade II* listed building since 3 November 1954. The park and gardens were restored between 2007 and 2008 with almost £3.9 million from the Heritage Lottery Fund and £1.2 million from Calderdale Council. The gardens were listed Grade II on 27 June 2000.

The hall is currently open to the public, the "West Yorkshire Folk Museum" being housed in an adjoining barn and farm buildings. The hall has a variety of restored workshops, including a brewery, a basket-weaving shop, a tannery, a stable and an extensive collection of horse-drawn carriages. The park also contains a dry stone walling exhibition, children's play area and miniature steam railway.

The hall has been used for filming the movie Peterloo, and the 2019 and 2022 BBC/HBO television series Gentleman Jack about its former owner Anne Lister. As a result of the television series, watched by almost six million people each week, the hall saw a trebling of visitors, leading Calderdale Council to plan an extension of the opening times.

The oak-panelled music room contains a square piano, dated 1769, by John Pohlman, one of his oldest. The piano has never been restored, although the oak stand is not original.

See also
Grade II* listed buildings in Calderdale
Listed buildings in Northowram

References

Bibliography

External links 

 The Restoration and Enhancement of Shibden Park at Landscape Institute Yorkshire & Humber Branch

1420s establishments in England
Buildings and structures in Halifax, West Yorkshire
Country houses in West Yorkshire
Gardens in West Yorkshire
Grade II* listed buildings in West Yorkshire
Grade II listed parks and gardens in West Yorkshire
Historic house museums in West Yorkshire
LGBT history in England
Museums in Halifax, West Yorkshire
Timber framed buildings in Yorkshire